Rob Harmeling (born 4 December 1964) is a retired Dutch professional road bicycle racer. Harmeling rode the Tour de France three times: in 1991 he was the lanterne rouge, in 1992 he won a stage, and in 1994 he was disqualified for hanging onto the team car. As amateur, Harmeling competed in the road race at the 1988 Summer Olympics and finished in 38th place. He won the world title in team time trial at the 1986 UCI Road World Championships.

In 2023 Harmeling joined the new Dutch continental tour team Tour de Tietema-Unibet as directeur sportif.

Major results

1986
Tijdrit Velddriel
 World Amateur 100km Team Time Trial Championship
Ronde van Overijssel
Flèche du Sud
1991
Tiel
1992
Steenwijk
Tour de France:
Winner stage 3

See also
 List of Dutch Olympic cyclists

References

External links 

Official Tour de France results for Rob Harmeling

1964 births
Living people
People from Hellendoorn
Dutch male cyclists
Dutch Tour de France stage winners
Cyclists at the 1988 Summer Olympics
Olympic cyclists of the Netherlands
UCI Road World Champions (elite men)
UCI Road World Championships cyclists for the Netherlands
Cyclists from Overijssel